Retrospektïẁ (Part III) is a live album by French rock band Magma. It was released in 1981, following Retrospektïẁ (Parts I+II) from the same year. It was originally released on RCA, and has since been reissued on Seventh Records.

Track listing

Side one 
 "Retrovision (Je suis revenu de l'univers)" – 18:13 (Christian Vander)

Side two 
 "Hhai (Version intégrale)" – 13:23 (Vander)
 "La Dawotsin" – 4:10 (Vander)

Personnel 
 Rene Garber – 1st Lieutenant
 Stella Vander – vocals
 Liza Deluxe – vocals
 Maria Popkiewicz – vocals
 Guy Khalifa – vocals (1, 3)
 Didier Lockwood – violin
 Benoit Widemann – keyboards
 Jean Pierre Fouquey – Rhodes piano (1, 2)
 Jean Luc Chevalier – guitar (1, 2), bass (3)
 Dominique Bertram – bass (1)
 Bernard Paganotti – bass (2, 3)
 Francois Laizeau – percussion (1, 2)
 Christian Vander – piano (3), vocals (2), drums
 Alain Francais – engineer

External links
 
 Retrospektïẁ (Part III) at Discogs
 Retrospektïẁ (Part III) at www.progarchives.com

Magma (band) albums
1981 live albums
RCA Records live albums